Ko Libong is one of 550 islands in the Andaman Sea. Lying off the coast of Thailand, it is a sub-district of Kantang District, Trang Procince, which includes Mu Ko Libong Archipelago and a small section of the shoreline near Kantang.

Geography
Ko Libong, Trang's largest island, is 30 minutes by long-tail boat from Hat Yao Ban Chao Mai Pier. Less visited than neighbouring isles, Ko Libong is known for its flora and fauna as much as for its beaches. The island is home to a small Muslim fishing community and has a few resorts on its west coast beaches.

On the east coast of Ko Libong at Laem Ju Hoi is a large area of mangroves protected by the Botanical Department as the Libong Archipelago Wildlife Reserve.

Ko Libong's sea channels have sea grass, a favorite food of the rare dugong, making the Libong Wildlife Sanctuary one of the last habitats of the species. Around 180 of the creatures survive there.

Population
The majority of the population is Muslim. They still have a tradition of burning coconut shells before the end of fasting in Ramadan. An ancient tradition, Ban Mod Tanoy, a small muban on Ko Libong is only place in Thailand where the tradition continues.

Environment
Two hundred dugongs are believed to still exist in Thai waters , 180 of them off Ko Libong. Dugongs are listed in Thailand's Wild Animal Reservation and Protection Act as one of 19 protected wild species in Thailand. Their presence is due to the more than 12,000 rai of seagrass meadows surrounding Libong. Seagrass is the dugong's favourite food and 11 of the 13 species of seagrasses in Thailand are found at Ko Libong. The leading causes of dugong deaths are fishing equipment and boat collisions. In the first nine months of 2019, 21 dugongs have died. Among them was an infant dugong that died from eating plastic waste, which led to severe gastritis and blood infection. The dugong losses are exacerbated by their low birth rate; they cannot be bred in captivity. Ko Libong inhabitants have united to create a preservation zone for dugongs where fishing and navigation are limited. Residents monitor compliance from a watchtower on the island. They also scour the seagrass meadows for plastic debris. Ko Libong's program will later be expanded to 11 other dugong habitats, including Ko Phra Thong, areas in the Prasae River delta, and Bandon Bay. Ko Libong was named an ASEAN Heritage Park at the 15th ASEAN Ministerial Meeting on the Environment in October 2019.

Economy
Bird nest collecting has been a money-making activity for Ko Libong residents for hundreds of years. Ko Libong no longer has bird's nests, but collectors seek them on other islands in the Trang Sea, on Ko Muk, Ko Petra, and Ko Laolieng or in neighbouring provinces like Phatthalung, Krabi, and Phang Nga. Bird's nests are harvested three times a year, in February, April, and July-August. Each job takes about seven to eight days. When harvesting nests for the third time, harvesters wait until the chicks have flown away.

Mu Ko Libong islands

See also

 Indian Ocean
 Trang Province
Outline of Thailand
List of islands of Thailand

Notes

References

External links
 

Islands of Thailand
Geography of Trang province
Islands of the Indian Ocean
Lists of coordinates
Tourist attractions in Trang province
Tambon of Trang Province